Riccardo Lombardi (16 August 1901 – 18 September 1984) was an Italian politician.

Early life 
Lombardi was born in Regalbuto, in the province of Enna (now in the province of Catania), in 1901. He studied at the Pennisi College of Acireale, and, after completing his high school studies, he attended the Polytechnic of Milan, where he obtained a degree in Industrial Engineering. He joined the Italian People's Party of Don Luigi Sturzo, thus sympathizing with the Christian Labor Party, founded in 1920 by left-wing members of the PPI, such as Guido Miglioli, to whom he was very attached. He participated in some actions of the Arditi del Popolo, including the defense of the socialist newspaper Avanti! from the assault of the fascist squads.

In 1923 he collaborated with Il Domani d'Italia, a newspaper of the Catholic left. When Italian Catholicism gave up actively opposing Fascism, he approached Marxist culture, also drawing inspiration from Antonio Gramsci, and, gradually, deviated from its own Catholic formation. After the suppression of political parties decreed on 5 November 1926 by the fascist regime, he continued to participate in clandestine activity with anti-fascist exponents of various tendencies, in particular with the communists whose activism he appreciated, while refusing to join the Communist Party of Italy.

In those years he met his partner, and then his wife, Ena Viatto (1906–1986), who fell in love with Lombardi and separated from Girolamo Li Causi. In 1930, following a leafleting action, he was attacked by the black shirts, then arrested and tortured with batons by the police at the Fascist headquarters. The beatings injured his lung and he never fully recovered from the after-effects of the violence.

Italian resistance and political activity 
A leader of the Italian Resistance against Mussolini during World War II, he was one of the founders of the Action Party in 1942.

He was member of the CLNAI from which at the Liberation he was appointed Prefect of Milan (from 30 April 1945 to December 1945): in this office he testified in favor of the former Fascist prefect of Milan Piero Parini. He participated in the first De Gasperi government (10 December 1945 – 1 July 1946) as Minister of Transport, starting the rapid reconstruction of the railway network.

He represented the Action Party in the Constituent Assembly of Italy from 1946 to 1948 and the Italian Socialist Party in the Chamber of Deputies from 1948 to 1983. In 1980, he was appointed president of the Italian Socialist Party.

Forged NATO document incident 
On 18 June 1970 Lombardi made claims before the Italian Chamber of Deputies, based on a document printed on NATO stationery, that the organization was planning to move troops into Italy as a result of the perceived political instability. Lombardi stated that he had received the document at the end of a meeting of NATO foreign ministers on 25 May 1970.

The document was later rejected as a forgery by the Italian Foreign Ministry and by NATO headquarters.

Death 
Lombardi died of pulmonary fibrosis and respiratory failure at the Roman clinic Mater Dei and, by his explicit will, was cremated without religious rites.

References

1901 births
1984 deaths
Politicians from the Province of Enna
Action Party (Italy) politicians
Italian Socialist Party politicians
Transport ministers of Italy
Italian resistance movement members
Members of the Constituent Assembly of Italy
Deputies of Legislature I of Italy
Deputies of Legislature II of Italy
Deputies of Legislature III of Italy
Deputies of Legislature IV of Italy
Deputies of Legislature V of Italy
Deputies of Legislature VI of Italy
Deputies of Legislature VII of Italy
Deputies of Legislature VIII of Italy
People from Regalbuto